Jørn Øien (born 19 January 1968 in Narvik) is a Norwegian jazz pianist and keyboard player. He is known from a number of festival performances and record releases, and cooperations with the likes of Thorgeir Stubø, Kjersti Stubø, Ernst-Wiggo Sandbakk, John Pål Inderberg, Tore Brunborg, Knut Værnes, Kjell Karlsen, Terje Gewelt, Roger Johansen, Paal Nilssen-Love, Per Zanussi and Torstein Lofthus.

Career 

Øien was educated at the "Nord-Norsk Musikkonservatorium" (1987–91), where he studied the music of Edvard Grieg while he played in bands such as "Stett", "Tutu" and "Corny Horns". Øien participated in the NRK series "Ung norsk jazz" with a trio comprising Trond Sverre Hansen (drums) and Konrad Kaspersen (bass). This led to the formation of a jazz band "Jazz i Nord" from Troms, consisting of country musicians, where the trombonist Øystein B. Blix also contributed. This partnership is evidence on the record Song, Fall Soft (1995) with the vocalist Marit Sandvik.
 
In 1996 he led the jam backing band at Moldejazz Festival, and moved to Oslo, and settled as one of the most used freelance pianists in the last half of the 20th century in the Norwegian capital. Other cooperation was with Knut Værnes, Staffan William-Olsson's records Smile (1998) and Oak road boogaloo (2000), Alf Kjellman Project, Beady Belle and Trionic, Ole Jacob Hansen, Espen Lind's band, Espen Rud Sextett, awarded Spellemannprisen 1998 for the album Rudlende, Tine Asmundsen's "Lonely Woman", and Geir Lysne's "Listening Ensemble". 
Øien is part of the band Oofotr (with two records) and the Nordland quintet North. In 2003 he led the "Nordnorsk jazzforum" prosjekt Milestones and appeared at Moldejazz together with George Garzone. He also play in Nils-Olav Johansen Band (2006–), and the band Moment with Tore Brunborg, Jens Fossum and Andreas Bye. Moreover, he played a sentral part in the play "Chet spiller ikke her" at "Torshovteateret" 2009–10.

Øien Short stories (2004) with his own trio Jørn Øien Trio in Oslo, comprising Terje Gewelt (bass) and Roger Johansen (drums). Former members were Paal Nilssen-Love (drums) and Kåre Garnes (bass). The trio now with Per Zanussi (bass) and Torstein Lofthus (drums) released the album Digging in the Dark (2010). In 2011 Erling Wiclund of NRK highlighted him as "one original and brilliant arrangerer in the upper world class".

At Vossajazz 2014, he appeared within Ivar Kolve's Polyostinat experience. Here he performed with an elite team of Norwegian musicians, including Kåre Kolve, Ellen Andrea Wang and last but not the least Jarle Vespestad. They delivered an indulgent poly rhythmic and poly harmonic treat for the discerning ear.

Works 
Commission for the "Festival of Northern Norway" (1998)
Steam Loco, commission for the "Vinterfestuka" in Narvik (2000)

Discography 
As  Jørn Øien Trio
2004: Short stories (Resonant Music)
2010: Digging in the Dark (Bolage Records)

With Oofotr
1995: Oofotr (Norske Gram)
2001: Oofotr II (Heilo)

With Geir Lysne Listening Ensemble
2002: Aurora Borealis – Nordic Lights (Groove Records, NRK), Suite For Jazz Orchestra
2003: Korall (ACT Records), feat. Sondre Bratland
2006: Boahjenásti – The North Star (ACT Records)
2009: The Grieg code (ACT Records)

With Staffan William-Olsson
1998: Smile! (Real Records)
2000: Oak road boogaloo (Real Records)

With Beady Belle
2003: Cewbeagappic
2005: Closer
2008: Belvedere (Jazzland Records)

With other projects
1995: Song, fall soft (Taurus/Gemini Records), with Marit Sandvik
1997: The Alf Kjellman Project
1997: Rudlende (Gemini Records), with Espen Rud Sextett
1998: Sympathetic, with Ernst-Wiggo Sandbakk & "The Sympathy Orchestra»
1999: Super Duper (Curling Legs), with Knut Værnes
2001: Big Band Bonanza (2001), with Kjell Karlsen
2003: aLive (Hazel Jazz, 2003), with Tine Asmundsen's Lonely Woman
2008: Paradiso, with Moment
2010: Live, with Magni Wentzel at Oslo Jazz Festival 2003
2011: How High is the Sky (Bolage), within Kjersti Stubø Band
2012: Northern Arc (Curling Legs), with Northern Arc
2012: New Surroundings (Schmell), within Kåre Nymark Band

References

External links 

20th-century Norwegian pianists
21st-century Norwegian pianists
Norwegian jazz pianists
Norwegian jazz composers
Musicians from Narvik
1968 births
Living people
Geir Lysne Listening Ensemble members
Oofotr members